Hussein Bayram (born 28 November 1975) is a French former professional boxer. He challenged three times for the European super welterweight title between 2004 and 2011. As an amateur, he competed in the men's welterweight event at the 1996 Summer Olympics. At the 1996 Summer Olympics, he lost to Marian Simion of Romania.

References

1975 births
Living people
French male boxers
Olympic boxers of France
Boxers at the 1996 Summer Olympics
Sportspeople from Angers
Light-middleweight boxers
Welterweight boxers